Latin Lovers is a Technicolor 1953 romantic musical comedy film made by MGM. It was directed by Mervyn LeRoy, and written by Isobel Lennart. The music score is by Nicholas Brodszky, and the cinematographer was Joseph Ruttenberg.

Plot summary
Nora Taylor has a fortune worth $37 million, but fears men only want her for her money. The current man in her life is Paul Chevron, who is even wealthier than she is.

Paul delays further discussion of marriage until he returns from a trip to Brazil to play polo. After hearing that men who go to Brazil often fall for the beautiful women there, Nora decides to fly there and surprise Paul, taking along trusty secretary Anne.

It is she who meets a new romantic interest, dashing Roberto Santos, who sweeps her off her feet. Once again, though, Nora is concerned about whether it's her or her riches that attracts him, so she announces her intention to give away all her money. Roberto disagrees about that because he thinks money can make life easier, so Nora leaves him.

Having remained calm during Nora's distraction with a new man, Paul returns to the U.S. and proposes marriage to her. Nora realizes she is not in love with him and says so. Anne surprisingly declares her own love for Paul, saying when it comes to the heart, money shouldn't matter. Nora comes to her senses and returns to Roberto, saying she still intends to give all her money away, but to him.

Cast
 Lana Turner as Nora Taylor
 Ricardo Montalbán as Roberto Santos (credited as Ricardo Montalban)
 John Lund as Paul Chevron
 Louis Calhern as Grandfather Eduardo Santos
 Jean Hagen as Anne Kellwood
 Eduard Franz as Dr. Lionel Y. Newman
 Beulah Bondi as Woman analyst
 Joaquin Garay as Zeca
 Archer MacDonald as Howard G. Hubbell
 Dorothy Neumann as Mrs. Newman
 Robert Burton as Mr. Cumberly
 Rita Moreno as Christina
 Gordon Richards as George, Paul's Butler
 Bess Flowers as Engagement Party Guest
 Pat Flaherty as Jim Webson - Polo Player

Notes
Fernando Lamas was originally cast in the role that Ricardo Montalbán played. Lamas and Lana Turner were lovers and when they broke up, she insisted he be replaced.

Reception
According to MGM records the film earned $1,056,000 in the US and Canada and $1,033,000 elsewhere, resulting in a loss of $837,000.

References

External links
 
 
 
 
 

Films directed by Mervyn LeRoy
1953 films
Metro-Goldwyn-Mayer films
American musical comedy films
1953 musical comedy films
Films produced by Joe Pasternak
1950s romantic musical films
American romantic musical films
American romantic comedy films
1953 romantic comedy films
1950s English-language films
1950s American films